The men's relay competition of the Vancouver 2010 Olympics was held at Whistler Olympic Park in Whistler, British Columbia on February 26, 2010. The race consisted of four laps of cross-country skiing, each lap a total of 7.5 km. Every 2.5 km there would be a shooting zone, the first one is prone and the second one is standing. Any misses in the shooting zones count as penalties which must be completed by going around a penalty loop right after the second shooting zone. There were four racers per team, each completing one lap. As all the teams started together, the team that crossed the finish line first would win.

Results
The race started at 11:30.

References

External links
 2010 Winter Olympics results: Men's 4x7.5 km Relay, from https://web.archive.org/web/20091025194336/http://www.vancouver2010.com/; retrieved 2010-02-25.

Relay